Qala Phusa (Aymara qala stone, phusa siku, "stone siku", also spelled Calapusa) is a  mountain in the Andes of Bolivia. It is situated in the La Paz Department, Larecaja Province, Sorata Municipality. Qala Phusa lies north of the Janq'u Uma-Illampu massif of the Cordillera Real, northwest of the mountain Wila Quta and southeast of Llawi Imaña.

References 

Mountains of La Paz Department (Bolivia)